Microvelia buenoi is a species of smaller water strider in the family Veliidae. It is found in Europe & Northern Asia (excluding China) and North America.

References

Further reading

External links

 

Veliidae
Articles created by Qbugbot
Insects described in 1920